Numèè (Naa Numee, Naa-Wee), or Kwényi (Kwenyii), is a New Caledonian language, the one spoken at the southern tip of the island, as well as on the Isle of Pines offshore. Despite its name, it is probably not the language that gave its name to the capital of New Caledonia, Nouméa; that seems to have been its close relative Ndrumbea, which used to be spoken there. Like Ndrumbea, Numèè is one of the few Austronesian languages with tones.

References

External links 
 ELAR archive of Documentation and Description of Numèè

New Caledonian languages
Languages of New Caledonia
Tonal languages in non-tonal families